Siemon Edward Top (born 1 January 1972 in Ommen) is a Dutch composer.

Top studied violin and composition with Peter-Jan Wagemans at the Rotterdam Conservatoire. He won the Dutch prize for composition in 1999. He also studied composition with Klaas de Vries. After his graduation he studied music theory and analysis at King's College London.

During the Dutch Music Days of 2004 he won the Henriëtte Bosmans Prize for his orchestra work Marble Sparks. He also won the 2003 Salvatore Martirano Memorial Composition Award at the University of Illinois for his String Quartet Nr. 1.

Most of his music has been published by Donemus in Amsterdam.

Selected works
 Stillpoint  (1995)
 Overwhelming Blankness of the Ultimate Meaninglessness of Tragedy (1996)
 String Quartet Nr. 1 (1998)
 Silk Execution (1999)
 Symphony Gouden Draak (2000)
 Sonate for violin and piano (2001)
 Piano Trio "en weende hij bitter" (Dutch: And He Wept Bitterly) (2001)
 String Quartet Nr. 2 "Das Lied der Schwermuth" (2002)
 Most Beautiful Bird of Paradise (2003)
 Marble Sparks (2004)
 34 - Concerto for electric guitar and wind orchestra (2006)
 Jimmy (2007)
Concerto for violin and two orchestras (2007)

Honors and awards
 1999 - Composition Prize, Rotterdam Conservatoire
 2003 - Martirano Award, University of Illinois, Urbana-Champaign
 2004 - Bosmans Prize, Netherlands Music Days, Utrecht
 2006 - Atahualpa Award, National University of Lanús, Buenos Aires
 2007 - New Millennium Award, Birmingham Conservatoire
 2008 - Toonzetters

References

External links
Website Edward Top
Edward Top at Donemus
Article on Top at Donemus

1972 births
Living people
Codarts University for the Arts alumni
Alumni of King's College London
People from Ommen
20th-century classical composers
21st-century classical composers
Dutch male classical composers
Dutch classical composers
20th-century Dutch male musicians
21st-century male musicians